is a Japanese voice actor. He currently works for Aoni Production.

Voice roles

Television
Atashin'chi (????) (Mizushima Husband)
Digimon Xros Wars (????) (Angemon)
Mirai Keisatsu Urashiman (????) (Ryuu)
Ginga: Nagareboshi Gin (????) (Jinnai)
Legend of the Galactic Heroes (????) (Tonio)
One Piece (????) (Yasopp)
Saint Seiya ((????) Libra Dohko)

Film
Saint Seiya: The Movie (????) (Sagitta Maya)
One Piece Film: Red (2022) (Yasopp)

References

External links
 
Aoni Production

1955 births
Living people
People from Mobara
Japanese male voice actors
Male voice actors from Chiba Prefecture
Aoni Production voice actors